Bohartilla is a genus of insects belonging to the monotypic family Bohartillidae.

The species of this genus are found in Caribbean.

Species:

Bohartilla joachimscheveni 
Bohartilla kinzelbachi 
Bohartilla megalognatha

References

Strepsiptera